Yuan Guoping (1906 – March 14, 1941) was a Communist army officer who participated in the Northern Expedition, the first phase of the Chinese Civil War (1927–37) and the Second Sino-Japanese War.

Early life
Born in Baoqing (in present-day Shaodong County), Hunan Province, Yuan joined the Communist Youth League in 1924, at the age of 18. In October 1925, he joined the Communist Party of China while attending Whampoa Military Academy. In July 1926, he participated in the Northern Expedition as a member of the Kuomintang Fourth Army. Later, he joined Communist uprisings against the Kuomintang in Nanchang, Jiangxi province (August 1, 1927) and Guangzhou, Guangdong province (December 13, 1927) before going to southern Jiangxi in defense of the Chinese Soviet Republic against multiple Kuomintang attacks.

Second Sino-Japanese War and death

In March 1938, he was made a representative of the Communist Party in the New Fourth Army. Yuan was killed by Kuomintang forces in the New Fourth Army Incident. In June 1955, he was interred at Yuhuatai Memorial Park of Revolutionary Martyrs, alongside Zhou Zikun.

1906 births
1941 deaths
People from Shaoyang
Military personnel killed in the Second Sino-Japanese War
New Fourth Army generals
Burials in Nanjing